Keraunography or keranography is the belief that lightning, when striking an object (generally a human body), can leave markings which constitute a photographic image of surrounding objects.  It is generally considered a myth.

Origins
Like most folklore, it is impossible to trace the origins of keraunography.  However, it seems to have attracted scientific and media attention in England in the early 19th century, and by Victorian times the term "keraunography" had been coined to describe numerous unconnected events.  With increasing scientific understanding of electricity and the popularity of photography, the time was right in the 19th century for keraunography, which seems to combine both concepts, to enter the public consciousness.  However, it is likely that anecdotal accounts of keraunography had existed long before there was a word for it.

Relationship to other myths
Lightning, being a dramatic and often-seen (yet mysterious and poorly understood) aspect of nature, has since ancient times been the subject of mythology and folklore regarding its origins, effects, and various ways to ward it off.  As mentioned previously, the 19th century were a breeding ground for myths about electricity and photography.  Sympsychography, by which brain waves are used to produce a photographic image, was a deliberate joke, but no less taken as truth by members of the public.  Also possibly related to keraunography is the mistaken belief that the last image a dying person sees is burned into their retina, like a photograph taken at the time of death.

Modern perception
Although to some degree science has still not fully explained all the behaviours of lightning, very few people currently accept keraunography as truth.  It is evident that lightning strikes do indeed produce burn marks, and like any basically random shape (clouds, birthmarks, inkblots, etc.) it is human nature to see shapes in them.  The lightning often leaves skin marks in characteristic Lichtenberg figures, sometimes called lightning flowers; they may persist for hours or days, and are a useful indicator for medical examiners when trying to determine the cause of death. Although humans being struck by lightning is of course rare, it is nonetheless possible that over a wide period of time, certain cases of burn marks would exist which could be said to resemble objects nearby the point of the lightning strike.  However, these cases are almost certainly the product of coincidence rather than evidence of any photographic property of lightning.  No supposed case of keraunography has been investigated by modern science, and unless further evidence is presented, it remains a strange object of 19th-century British folklore.

Sources

References

General sources
 

Photographic techniques
Lightning
Pseudoscience